Mésarchitecture, is a Paris and Lisbon-based architecture firm founded by French architects Didier Faustino and Pascal Mazoyer in 2002.

Awards and Distinctions
 2010 : "Prix Dejean", Académie d’Architecture, Paris, France.
 Selected for Mies Van der Rohe price, 2007.
 Selected for the Iakov Chernikhov International Prize for Young Architects, en 2010, 2008 (finaliste) et 2006.
 2002 : Award winner of "Nouveaux Albums de la Jeune Architecture", with "Bureau des Mésarchitectures", Paris.
 2001 : Award winner of the contemporary art price "Prémio da Tabaqueira", Lisbon, Portugal 2001.
 2000 : Award winner of "l'Envers des Villes", Paris.

Notable works

2009, Dr Jekyll & Mr Hyde

2008, Sky is the limit
Tea house, Yang Yang (South Korea) 
Purpose: Sky Is The Limit is a domestic space sample, propulsed 20 meters above the ground, a tea room projected in a state of weightlessness, over the troubled horizon. The building’s body is nothing more than a fragile skeleton. Its thin arachnoid structure sets under tension a vertical void. A bicephalous head over this fleshless body is composed of two entities. Two captive voids of strictly similar dimensions provide two opposing experiences.

2007 H-Box
Mobile home video
Purpose: H-Box: Mobile home video, is a mobile space designed to display video art for Hermès International.
It is composed of modules of high resistance lightweight materials, easily assembled, disassembled and transported, to travel around the world. Videos specially made for the touring project are updated every year.

2003, One Square Meter House
One person dwelling, Hygienapolis
Purpose: By reducing living space to its smallest unit, the square meter, this dwelling for one person promotes a critical view of land speculation. Beyond this, it subverts the notions of habitability, adaptability and evolutivity. A body-trap that takes contemporary narcissism to its most absurd, One Square Meter House makes public space the only possible terrain for social interaction.

External links
Mésarchitecture

Architecture firms of France